State leaders in the 13th century BC – State leaders in the 11th century BC – State leaders by year
This is a list of state leaders in the 12th century BC (1200–1101 BC).

Africa: Northeast

Egypt: New Kingdom

Nineteenth Dynasty of the New Kingdom (complete list) –
Amenmesses, Pharaoh (1203–1197 BC)
Seti II, Pharaoh (1201–1198 BC)
Siptah, Pharaoh (1197–1191 BC)
Twosret, Queen (1191–1189 BC)

Twentieth Dynasty of the New Kingdom (complete list) –
Setnakhte, Pharaoh (1189–1186 BC)
Ramesses III, Pharaoh (1186–1155 BC)
Ramesses IV, Pharaoh (1155–1149 BC)
Ramesses V, Pharaoh (1149–1145 BC)
Ramesses VI, Pharaoh (1145–1137 BC)
Ramesses VII, Pharaoh (1136–1129 BC)
Ramesses VIII, Pharaoh (1130–1129 BC)
Ramesses IX, Pharaoh (1129–1111 BC)
Ramesses X, Pharaoh (1111–1107 BC)
Ramesses XI, Pharaoh (1107–1077 BC)

Asia

Asia: East
China
Shang Dynasty of China – 
Wǔ Dīng, King (1250–1192 BC)
Zǔ Gēng, King (early 12th century BC)
Zu Jia, King (early 12th century BC)
Lin Xin, King (early 12th century BC)
Geng Ding, King (c.1170–c.1147 BC)
Wǔ Yǐ, King (1147–1113 BC)
Wén Dīng, King (1112–1102 BC)
Dì Yǐ, King (1101–1076 BC)

Asia: Southeast
Vietnam
Hồng Bàng dynasty (complete list) –
Ất line, (c.1251–c.1162 BC)
Bính line, (c.1161–c.1055 BC)

Asia: West

Diaokhi –
Sien, King (c.1120–1100 BC)

Hittite: New Kingdom, Asia minor –
Suppiluliuma II, Ruler (c.1207–1178 BC, short chronology) 

Tyre, Phoenecia – 
Baal, King (c.1193)
Pummay, King (c.1163–1125)

Assyria: Middle Assyrian Period
Tukulti-Ninurta I, King (c.1233–1197 BC, short chronology)
Ashur-nadin-apli, King (c.1196–1194 BC, short chronology)
Ashur-nirari III, King (c.1193–1188 BC, short chronology)
Enlil-kudurri-usur, King (c.1187–1183 BC, short chronology)
Ninurta-apal-Ekur, King (c.1182–1180 BC, short chronology)
Ashur-Dan I, King (c.1179–1133 BC) dates are no longer subject to middle/short chronology distinctions
Ninurta-tukulti-Ashur, King (c.1133 BC) 
Mutakkil-nusku, King (c.1133 BC) 
Ashur-resh-ishi I, King (c.1133–1115 BC) 
Tiglath-Pileser I, King (c.1115–1076 BC) 

Kassite Dynasty (Third Dynasty of Babylon) – 
Adad-shuma-usur, King (c.1216–1187 BC), contemporary of Ashur-nirari III of Assyria
Meli-Shipak II, King (c.1186–1172 BC)
Marduk-apla-iddina I, King (c.1171–1159 BC)
Zababa-shuma-iddin, King (c.1158 BC)
Enlil-nadin-ahi, King (c.1157–1155 BC) Defeated by Shutruk-Nahhunte of Elam

Dynasty IV of Babylon, from Isin 
Marduk-kabit-ahheshu, King (c.1155–1146 BC)
Itti-Marduk-balatu, King (c.1146–1132 BC)
Ninurta-nadin-shumi, King (c.1132–1126 BC)
Nabu-kudurri-usur, King (c.1126–1103 BC)
Enlil-nadin-apli, King (c.1103–1100 BC)

Elam: Shutrukid dynasty (complete list) –
Hallutush-Inshushinak, King (c.1200 BC–?)
Shutruk-Nahhunte I, King (c.1158 BC)
Kutir-Nahhunte II, King (c.1155 BC)
Shilhak-Inshushinak I, King (?)
Hutelutush-Inshushinak, King (c.1110 BC)
Shilhina-Hamru-Lakamar, King (1110 BC–?)

References

State Leaders
-
12th-century BC rulers